Mikhail Aleksandrovich Sergachev (born 25 June 1998) is a Russian professional ice hockey defenceman for the Tampa Bay Lightning of the National Hockey League (NHL). He was selected ninth overall by the Montreal Canadiens in the 2016 NHL Entry Draft. Sergachev won back-to-back Stanley Cups with the Lightning in 2020 and 2021.

Player career

Juniors
Sergachev began his junior career in Russia, where he played for Irbis Kazan of the MHL. Sergachev was drafted sixth overall in the CHL Import Draft, selected by the Windsor Spitfires of the Ontario Hockey League (OHL). He committed to the Spitfires on 8 July 2015, stating that playing in the OHL offered him the best of chance of achieving his dream of playing in the NHL.

In his rookie OHL season, Sergachev emerged as a top defenceman, finishing third in scoring amongst defenceman and winning the Max Kaminsky Trophy as the OHL's most outstanding defenceman.

Leading up to the 2016 NHL Entry Draft, Sergachev was highly regarded by scouts and was considered one of the top defencemen available in the draft. Ultimately, he was selected by the Montreal Canadiens ninth overall, the second defenceman drafted behind Olli Juolevi of the Vancouver Canucks. On 1 July 2016, the Canadiens announced they had signed Sergachev to a three-year, entry-level contract.

On 28 May 2017, Sergachev helped the Windsor Spitfires to capture their third Memorial Cup championship in franchise history. Sergachev was also named as an All-Star of the Memorial Cup tournament.

Professional

Montreal Canadiens
After attending his first Canadiens' training camp, Sergachev impressively made the opening night roster for the 2016–17 season. He made his NHL debut with Montreal in a 4–1 victory over the Buffalo Sabres on 13 October 2016. He appeared in four games with the Canadiens before he was returned to continue his development with junior club, the Windsor Spitfires, on 31 October 2016.

Tampa Bay Lightning
On 15 June 2017, the Canadiens traded Sergachev (along with a conditional second-round pick in the 2018 NHL Entry Draft) to the Tampa Bay Lightning in exchange for forward Jonathan Drouin and a conditional sixth-round draft pick in the same draft.

On 6 October 2017, Sergachev made his Lightning debut, where he also recorded his first career NHL assist and point in a 5–3 victory over the visiting Florida Panthers. On 19 October, Sergachev scored his first and second career NHL goals against the Columbus Blue Jackets at Nationwide Arena, which came in a 2–0 Lightning victory. The two goals also made Sergachev the youngest Lightning defenceman (and second-youngest Russian-born defenceman) to record a multi-goal game. On 16 December, Sergachev recorded the game-winning goal in Lightning's 6–5 win over the Colorado Avalanche at the Pepsi Center. This was Sergachev's fifth game-winning goal of the season, which made him only the fourth rookie defenceman in NHL history to score five game-winning goals in their rookie season. On 12 April 2018, Sergachev made his Stanley Cup playoff debut in a 5–2 Lightning win over the visiting New Jersey Devils. Sergachev also recorded his first career playoff assist (and point) in the Lightning victory. On 21 April 2018, Sergachev recorded his first career playoff goal in a 3–1 series clinching win over the New Jersey Devils at Amalie Arena. With the goal he also became the youngest player in Lightning history to record a playoff goal.

On 13 January 2018, the NHL Department of Player Safety fined Sergachev $2,403.67 for cross-checking Johan Larsson during the game against the Buffalo Sabres the night before at KeyBank Center. On 26 August 2020, Sergachev recorded a goal and 2 assists to help the Lightning to a 7–1 Lightning victory over the Boston Bruins in game 3 of their second round series. Sergachev joined Eric Brewer and Victor Hedman as the only Lightning defensemen to record three points in a single playoff game.

On 25 November 2020, Sergachev signed a three-year, $14.4 million contract with the Lightning.

On 13 July 2022, Sergachev signed an eight-year, $60 million contract extension with the Lightning. His teammates Anthony Cirelli and Erik Cernak also signed eight-year extensions with the team that same day.

Career statistics

Regular season and playoffs

International

Awards and honours

References

External links
 

1998 births
Living people
Montreal Canadiens draft picks
Montreal Canadiens players
National Hockey League first-round draft picks
People from Nizhnekamsk
Russian ice hockey defencemen
Sportspeople from Tatarstan
Stanley Cup champions
Tampa Bay Lightning players
Windsor Spitfires players